Mudiyah District  is a district of the Abyan Governorate, Yemen. As of 2003, the district had a population of 34,879 inhabitants.

Localities:

 Rashnah

References

Districts of Abyan Governorate